Ballymena Academy is a mixed gender, voluntary grammar school in the market town of Ballymena in County Antrim, Northern Ireland. It was founded in 1828 as a small provincial school for children in the town and surrounding agricultural hinterland.

Admissions
The school currently has approximately 1300 pupils and 128 members of staff. The school has  of mature grounds situated on the Galgorm Road, just west of the town centre.

The school motto is Tenax Propositi meaning Steadfast in Purpose.

Following the August 2014 retirement of J. R. Hassard (announced on 19 November 2013), the appointment of Stephen Black (former headmaster at Antrim Grammar School) was announced on 7 March 2013; he became headmaster on 1 September 2014.

Notable former pupils

 John Alderdice, Baron Alderdice, Liberal Democrat peer, first Speaker of the Northern Ireland Assembly
 Kirsty Barr, Olympic Trap Shooter, Commonwealth Silver Medallist, World and European Silver Medallist, Olympian for Great Britain and Northern Ireland at the 2020 Tokyo Olympics
 William Booth CVO, chaplain
  Darwin Caldwell FREng, academic and expert in robotics who is Founding Director of the Italian Institute of Technology in Genoa, Italy, where he is also the Director of the Dept. of Advanced Robotics.
 Roger Casement, British diplomat and early human rights campaigner for the Congolese, later helped organise the Irish Volunteers and executed in 1916 under the Treason Act. Casement Park Ulster GAA grounds are named after him.
 Barry Cowan, journalist and broadcaster with BBC Northern Ireland
 George Dawson, DUP MLA from 2003 to 2007 for East Antrim
 George Alexander Duncan (1902–2005), (first) professor of political economy, Trinity College, Dublin and advocate of Austrian economics
 Steven Davis, Aston Villa, Glasgow Rangers, Southampton and Northern Ireland footballer
 Lucy Evangelista, Miss Northern Ireland 2005, placed in top ten at Miss World.
 Edgar Graham, Northern Irish Unionist political figure, assassinated by the IRA in 1983 at the age of 29
 George Boyle Hanna, Northern Irish Unionist politician and minister
 Air Vice-Marshal William Harbison CB CBE DFC, station commander from 1963 to 1965 of RAF Leuchars
 David Humphreys, Irish rugby union star
 Peter Johnston, Controller of BBC Northern Ireland (November 2006–present)
 Alan Jones, architect, professor at Queen's University Belfast and President of the Royal Institute of British Architects, 2019–21.
 Mark Logan, Conservative MP (2019-)
 Luke Marshall, is an Irish professional rugby union player, who currently plays for the Ulster Ravens 
 James McAteer, Astrophysicist and author
 Commandant Vonla McBride - head of the WRNS 1976-9
 Willie John McBride, rugby player. Captain of the Irish international team and British & Irish Lions rugby team
 Colin Murdock, former professional footballer, now lawyer
 James Sayers, professor of electron physics from 1946 to 1972 at the University of Birmingham, from 1939 to 1943 developed the cavity magnetron which was essential for centimetric radar, and later worked from 1943 to 1945 on the Manhattan Project
 Robert Simpson, Ulster Unionist MP (NI) from 1953 to 1972 for Mid Antrim
 Robin Swann, Ulster Unionist Party     MLA (2011-) Party Leader (2017–2019), Minister for Health (2020-)
 Colin Wallace, former British soldier and psychological warfare operative, subject of a wrongful imprisonment case

Sport 
Sport is an important part of Ballymena Academy and the school is well known as one of the most successful in Northern Ireland, notably at rugby.

Head of girls' sport is Diane McNeill and head of boys' sport is John Nicholl.

The main boys' sport at Ballymena Academy is rugby. At the Kingspan Stadium, Belfast, the school won the 2010 Ulster Schools Cup final when they beat Belfast Royal Academy 10–7. Previous wins were recorded in 1972 and 1981. The school has also won the Subsidiary Shield on seven occasions - more than any other school.

The Medallion (under 15) team has won the Medallion Shield twice, in 1970 and 2018. A share of the shield was secured twice after drawn finals.

In 2021, the school won the first ever Danske Bank U16s Schools Cup, beating Methodist College Belfast 29-17.

The main girls' sport is hockey and the Ulster Schools Cup has been won outright on six occasions. The trophy has also been shared a further three times after drawn finals. The most recent win was in 2001. Following this, they have proceeded to the Kate Russel All Ireland school girls hockey championship. In 2014 the 1XI reached the schools cup semi-final at Lisnagarvey, they lost on penalty flicks, after a 3–3 draw, to Rainey Endowed school.

Coat of arms

The worker ant represents hard work. The badger on the crest, accompanied by a lamp representing learning, is a pun on 'Brocklamont', site of the new school buildings, with 'brock' being an archaic word for badger (non-archaic Irish, "broc").

Sporting, academic, musical and other arts achievement are recognised by the award of a similar but distinctive coat of arms worn on the school blazer and also by the presentation of honours ties.

References

External links
 Ballymena Academy Homepage

Grammar schools in County Antrim
Educational institutions established in 1828
Ballymena
1828 establishments in Ireland